Jeffry D. Wert (born May 8, 1946) is an American historian and author specializing in the American Civil War. He has written several books on the subject, which have been published in multiple languages and countries.

Early life
Jeffry Wert's interest in history first began after an eighth grade school field trip to the Gettysburg Battlefield. After high school he graduated cum laude with a B.A. from Lock Haven University, and a M.A. from The Pennsylvania State University, both in History. He worked for many years as a history teacher at Penns Valley Area High School in Spring Mills, Pennsylvania.

Bibliography
From Winchester to Cedar Creek: The Shenandoah Campaign of 1864 — 1987
Mosby's Rangers: The True Adventure of the Most Famous Command of the Civil War — 1991
General James Longstreet: The Confederacy's Most Controversial Soldier — 1993
Custer: The Controversial Life of George Armstrong Custer — 1996
A Brotherhood Of Valor: The Common Soldiers of The Stonewall Brigade CSA and The Iron Brigade USA — 2000
Gettysburg, Day Three — 2002
The Sword of Lincoln: The Army of the Potomac — 2006
Cavalryman of the Lost Cause: A Biography of J. E. B. Stuart — 2008
A Glorious Army: Robert E. Lee's Triumph, 1862–1863 — 2011
Civil War Barons: The Tycoons, Entrepreneurs, Inventors, and Visionaries Who Forged Victory and Shaped a Nation — 2018

References

External links
 Author page at Simon & Schuster

1946 births
Living people
Historians of the American Civil War
American military writers
Historians of the Southern United States
Historians of the United States
American military historians
American male non-fiction writers